Ruth Mader (born 11 July 1974) is an Austrian film director and screenwriter. She has directed six films between 1992 and 2003. Her film Struggle was screened in the Un Certain Regard section at the 2003 Cannes Film Festival.

Filmography
 Endstation obdachlos (1992)
 Gatsch (1993)
 Kilometer 123,5 (1994)
 Gfrasta (1999)
 Null Defizit (2001)
 Struggle (2003)
 What Is Love (2012)
 Life Guidance (2017)

References

External links

1974 births
Living people
Film people from Vienna